Archbishop Arkadios II (died 643) was the head of the Church of Cyprus during the 630s. He was a supporter of the Monoenergism formula also propounded by Patriarch Sergius I of Constantinople, and Emperor Heraclius.

Arkadios wrote an epistle supporting Monoenergism and disparaging its opponents, of which the chief then was Sophronius of Jerusalem. When Sophronius became Patriarch in 634, Sophronius sent a letter to Arkadios requesting him to call a synod. Arkadios invited Cyrus of Alexandria, as well as Sergius and Honorius. Kyros arrived himself, and so did representatives of Constantinople and Rome. Then Arkadios invited Sophronius. Sophronius and his protégé Maximus the Confessor each sent representatives of his own.

When the Jerusalmite delegation arrived, Arkadios received the guests with honor. The next morning, all 46 of the dignitaries haggled over the details. The anti-Monoenergists agreed upon a common letter, but Arkadios declared its suggestions to be anathema. Sophronius asked him, "What then do you want - that this should reach the emperor?" Arkadius retorted, "It is because of your lack of belief, and because of the false doctrine you and your companions hold, in that you resist the truth [of Monoenergism]". Cyrus then cut short the debate and ordered Sophronius's letter to issue to the Emperor Heraclius.

Heraclius promptly replaced Monoenergism with Monothelitism and issued an Edict to all the metropolitan sees (probably the Ecthesis). When this Edict arrived in Cyprus, Arkadios added his signature to the list.

Writings
Epistle on Monothelitism Lost.

References

 George of Reshaina, "An Early Life of Maximus the Confessor" trans. Sebastian P Brock, pp. 315–7

Year of birth missing
643 deaths
Archbishops of Cyprus
7th-century Byzantine bishops
7th-century archbishops
Christology